Mountain Air was a scenic flight operation founded in 1988 and was based at the Chateau Airfield on the edge of the Tongariro National Park Dual World Heritage area. The majority of Mountain Air's business were scenic flights, but the company also provided charter flight options, and was the sole provider of aerial tracking for Kiwi and Short-tailed bats in the Central North Island. On 28 March 2021, the airline ceased all operations.

Mountain Air was owned by Bhrent and Kathy Guy. A former part of the company was operating independently as Fly My Sky in the Auckland Region until the end of June 2021, when it too ceased all operations.

History 

Mountain Air was founded in 1988 by Keith and Robyn McKenzie and used a Cessna 172 and 206 to conduct scenic flights over the Tongariro National Park. The company established an airstrip on a high country sheep station airfield at the base of the active volcano, Mount Ruapehu. Recently passengers have had the added attraction of viewing sites in the Park where filming for The Lord of the Rings film trilogy took place.

In 2005 then Prime Minister Helen Clarke was flying aboard a Piper Aztec when the door came loose mid-flight. The plane landed safely.

Two Britten Norman Islanders and two Piper Aztec aircraft were added to the fleet and services extended to provide New Zealand wide charter. Schedule services were developed to provide several flights a day between Auckland International Airport, Whangarei and Great Barrier Island in the Hauraki Gulf in 1998. Two more Britten-Norman Islander aircraft were added to the fleet in 2006 & 2007.

The Chateau division was sold to Bhrent and Kathy Guy in 2007 and retains the name ‘Mountain Air’ operating the Cessna 172 and Cessna 206. The Auckland base was renamed 'Fly My Sky' and now is operated as a separate company by Keith and Robyn McKenzie.

Flight operations at Mountain Air include:  
Volcanic scenic flights around Tongariro National Park and the central north island
Aerial tracking for kiwi, short-tailed bats and deer
Photography Charter
Air transfers for hunting trips are seldom done these days but can be requested.
General air transfers between aerodromes throughout New Zealand

On March 28, the airline shut down and ceased all operations.

Fleet 
The fleet consisted of one Cessna 172 and one Cessna 206.

See also 
 Air transport in New Zealand
 List of airlines of New Zealand
 List of general aviation operators of New Zealand

References

External links
 

Defunct airlines of New Zealand
Airlines established in 1988
Airlines disestablished in 2021
New Zealand companies established in 1988